This is a list of earthquakes in 1941. Only magnitude 6.0 or greater earthquakes appear on the list. Lower magnitude events are included if they have caused death, injury or damage. Events which occurred in remote areas will be excluded from the list as they wouldn't have generated significant media interest. All dates are listed according to UTC time. With 1,200 lives lost, Saudi Arabia experienced the heaviest death toll on January 11. Other deadly quakes occurred in Iran, Turkey, Taiwan, Burma, and China. There were 15 magnitude 7.0+ events altogether. The largest event was in the north Atlantic Ocean at the Azores–Gibraltar Transform Fault in November with a magnitude 8.0. Other large events struck India, Japan, and Mexico to name a few. Australia saw a couple of unusually large quakes this year.

Overall

By death toll 

 Note: At least 10 casualties

By magnitude 

 Note: At least 7.0 magnitude

Notable events

January

February

March

April

May

June

July

August

September

October

November

December

References

1941
 
1941